SLR may refer to:

Science and technology 
 Satellite laser ranging
 Scalable Linear Recording tape drive backup
 Sea level rise
 Self-loading rifle or semi-automatic rifle
 The UK L1A1 SLR rifle
 Semi-linear resolution, a search algorithm
 Sending loudness rating for microphones
 Simple LR parser (Simple Left-to-right parser)
 Single-lens reflex camera
 See also: Digital single-lens reflex camera (digital SLR or DSLR)
 SLR (company), a virtual reality company
 Service List Registry, of audiovisual services

Transport 
 Holden Torana SLR5000 car
 Mercedes-Benz 300 SLR
 Mercedes-Benz SLR McLaren
 Shimano Linear Response, a bicycle component
 Sri Lanka Railways
 St. Lawrence and Atlantic Railroad reporting mark

Other uses 
 Sébastien Loeb, a French racing team
 Stanford Law Review
 Statutory liquidity ratio